Ploiaria metapterina is a species of true bug found in SE Australia.

References

Reduviidae
Hemiptera of Australia
Insects described in 2007